Nickelodeon's Unfiltered (also known simply as Unfiltered) is an American game show that aired on Nickelodeon from July 11, 2020 to November 11, 2021. The series is hosted by Jay Pharoah, with panelists Darci Lynne, Gabrielle Nevaeh Green, and Lex Lumpkin.

Premise 
Celebrities hide their true identities behind an animated filter and voice changer in the game show, while panelists are given clues and compete to identify the mystery guest.

Production 
On May 6, 2020, it was announced that the show was greenlit under the title Game Face along with Group Chat with Annie & Jayden in the midst of the COVID-19 pandemic, necessitating remote filming. On June 26, 2020, it was announced that the show was retitled to Unfiltered, and would premiere on July 11, 2020, with host Jay Pharoah and panelists Darci Lynne, Gabrielle Nevaeh Green, and Lex Lumpkin.

On August 27, 2020, it was announced that Nickelodeon had ordered nine additional episodes for the series, that began airing on September 5. On January 7, 2021, it was announced that Nickelodeon had ordered a second season, alongside seven additional episodes of Side Hustle, which premiered later that night.

Episodes

Series overview

Season 1 (2020)

Season 2 (2021)

Special (2021)

Ratings 
 

| link2             = #Season 2 (2021)
| episodes2         = 26
| start2            = 
| end2              = 
| startrating2      = 0.39
| endrating2        = 0.25
| viewers2          = |2}} 
}}

Notes

References

External links 
 
 

2020 American television series debuts
2020s American children's game shows
2020s Nickelodeon original programming
2021 American television series endings
English-language television shows
Impact of the COVID-19 pandemic on television
Nickelodeon game shows